Mohammad Bakri (born 1953;) is a Palestinian actor and film director.

Personal life
Bakri was born in the village of Bi'ina in Israel. He went to elementary school in his hometown and received his secondary education in the nearby city of Akko. He studied acting and Arabic literature at Tel Aviv University in 1973 and graduated three years later.

Bakri is married to Leila and together they have six children. His sons Adam, Ziad and Saleh Bakri are also actors.

Acting and film career
Bakri began his professional acting career in with Habima Theatre in Tel Aviv, Haifa theater and al-Kasaba theater in Ramallah. His one-man plays, The Pessoptimist (1986), The Anchor (1991), Season of Migration to the North (1993) and Abu Marmar (1999), were performed in Hebrew and Arabic.

After a few years of acting in Palestinian and Israeli film, Bakri began to act in international films in France, Belgium, the Netherlands, Denmark, Canada and Italy. Bakri also directed two documentary films, including the controversial Jenin, Jenin.

Controversy
After Operation Defensive Shield in April 2002, Bakri interviewed residents of the Jenin refugee camp and produced a film based on their testimony, Jenin, Jenin. Some of the survivors described a massacre of hundreds of people. After three showings the film was banned by the Israeli Film Board, which claimed it was not a documentary as it showed only one side of the story. Nevertheless, Bakri showed the film at the Tel Aviv and Jerusalem cinematheques and Arab theaters such as Al-Midan in Haifa.

Bakri petitioned the High Court of Justice for prohibiting the screening of the film on the grounds that it distorted the truth. After a long fight, the court rejected the censor's decision. In 2004, the Israeli High Court finally upheld its earlier overturn of the ban, but joined the Film Board in labeling the film a "propagandistic lie", based on Israeli sources that acknowledged only 52 Palestinian deaths, 38 of whom Israeli sources argued were armed fighters. In response to the court's criticism, Bakri stated that he had "seen hundreds of films that deny and ignore what happened to Palestinians, yet [people haven't] complained or tried to ban any film."

In 2007, five soldiers who fought in the Jenin refugee camp during Operation Defensive Shield in 2002 sued the cinematheques in Tel Aviv and Jerusalem for screening the film in the midst of the ban, and sued Bakri for 2.5 million NIS for producing the film. In July 2008, Bakri was acquitted of the charges.

Jenin-Jenin earned two awards: the best film award at the Carthage International Film Festival, 2002, and the International Prize for Mediterranean Documentary Filmmaking and Reporting.

Israeli right-wing group Im Tirtzu organized a campaign against Bakri. Im Tirtzu opposed a production of Federico García Lorca's The House of Bernarda Alba in which Bakri played the role of Bernarda. The play was produced in 2012 at Tel Aviv's Tzavta Theater. Israel's Academy of the Performing Arts was behind the production. While refusing Im Tirtzu's request to intervene, Culture Minister Limor Livnat criticized the judgment of the theater's administration.

Filmography

Actor

Director

Awards and recognition
 Award for the Best Actor for the role in Private  in Buenos Aires International Festival of Independent Cinema 2005
 Best Actor Award for Private by Saverio Costanzo, Locarno International Film Festival 2004
 Palestine Prize for Cinema 1999 Ramallah
 Award for the Best Actor for the role in Haifa by Rashid Masharawi, Valencia Festival. 1997
 Award for the Best Actor for the role in Beyond the Walls II by Uri Barabash, Valencia Festival. 1994
 Award for the Best Actor for the role in Beyond the Walls by Uri Barabash, Israel. 1984
 Award for the best actor for the role in Season of Migration to the North, by Tayeb Salih, adapted and directed by Ouriel Zohar, in the Acco Festival of Alternative Israeli Theatre, Israel, 1993.

References

External links
 

1953 births
Living people
Arab-Israeli film directors
Israeli film directors
Israeli film producers
Israeli male film actors
Israeli male stage actors
Tel Aviv University alumni